BWV is the Bach-Werke-Verzeichnis, the standard numbered catalogue of the works of Johann Sebastian Bach.

BWV or bwv may also refer to:

 Bayerischer Wald-Verein, the Bavarian Forest Club
 Bahau River Kenyah (obsolete ISO 639:b code: bwv), a language

 Body worn video

See also
 Buxtehude-Werke-Verzeichnis (BuxWV)
 BWB (disambiguation)